Hayet Rouini (born 10 August 1981) is a Tunisian judoka. She competed in the women's extra-lightweight event at the 2000 Summer Olympics.

References

1981 births
Living people
Tunisian female judoka
Olympic judoka of Tunisia
Judoka at the 2000 Summer Olympics
Place of birth missing (living people)
African Games medalists in judo
Competitors at the 1999 All-Africa Games
African Games gold medalists for Tunisia
21st-century Tunisian women